Bloom is the first Japanese studio album by South Korean girl group Red Velvet. It was released on April 6, 2022 through Avex Trax. Bloom is Red Velvet's first studio album released in four years and five months after the group's second Korean studio album Perfect Velvet (2017).

Background and release 
On December 10, 2021, it was announced that Red Velvet would be releasing their first Japanese studio album, Bloom. The album will mark the girl group's first Japanese release in almost two years, following the May 2019 extended play (EP) Sappy, which featured the singles "Sappy" and "Sayonara". Five of Bloom's eleven tracks are new, including the lead single "Wildside". In addition to the digest video of the premium event Red Velvet ReVeluv-Baby Party held in 2019, the first production limited edition DVD and Blu-ray will include footage of previous activities in Japan, live videos from A-Nation, and behind-the-scenes videos of the album shoot. Each member also created individualized shots with "special" designs for the release.

The album was initially set to be released on February 2, 2022 but postponed due to production issues, with no new release date stated. By March 12, the group opened their official Japanese Twitter account and announced that Bloom would be released on April 6. A content schedule was also posted, indicating that the gradual release of various promotional content for the album. The lead single was released on March 28, ahead of the album itself.

Composition 
The lead single, "Wildside", is a "cool" and "seductive" song "unique" to Red Velvet, and the lyrics contain a message that they will support themselves who do not give up to reach where they want to go. "Marionette" samples a xylophone signature line from the classic song, "The Nutcracker". "Jackpot" is a song described for its "exciting" atmosphere. "Snap Snap" expresses an era that relies on social media. "Color of Love" is a song described for its "charming" and "soft" melody. In addition, there are a total of 11 existing songs including "Sappy", "#Cookie Jar", "Sayonara", "Aitai-tai", "Swimming Pool", and "Cause It's You".

Commercial performance 
Bloom debuted at number five on Japan's weekly Oricon Albums Chart in the chart issue dated April 4–10, 2022. It also peaked at number two on the component daily Albums Chart. The album debuted at number two on Billboard Japan Hot Albums in the chart issue dated April 7–13, 2022. Additionally, it also debuted at numbers 41 and two on the component Download Albums and Top Albums Sales in the chart issue dated April 7–13, 2022.

Track listing

Notes 

 "Wildside" and "Sappy" are stylized in all caps.

 "Cause It's You" is stylized as "'Cause it's you".

 "Marionette" samples a xylophone signature line from Tchaikovsky's "The Nutcracker".

Charts

Weekly charts

Monthly charts

Year-end charts

Release history

References 

2022 albums
Japanese-language albums
Red Velvet (group) albums
Avex Trax albums
SM Entertainment albums